Louetsi-Bibaka is a department of Ngounié Province in Gabon. It had a population of 2,734 in 2013.

References 

Departments of Gabon